Male Companion is a 1964 romantic comedy film written and directed by Philippe de Broca based on the 1961 novel Gentleman in Waiting by André Couteaux. The film stars Jean-Pierre Cassel.

Plot
Antoine was raised into the easy life by his very rich grandfather. Following the death of his grandfather, the money has gone and Antoine falls under the influence of various "easy" people.

Cast
 Jean-Pierre Cassel as Antoine
 Catherine Deneuve as Isabelle
 Jean-Pierre Marielle as Balthazar
 Irina Demick as Nicole
 Annie Girardot as Clara
 Sandra Milo as Maria
 Marcel Dalio as Krieg von Spiel
 Jean-Claude Brialy as prince
 André Luguet as grandfather
 Valérie Lagrange as Louisette
 Paolo Stoppa as Professor Gaetano
 Adolfo Celi as Benvenuto
 Rosemary Dexter as student
 Jacques Dynam as Isabelle's father
 Rosy Varte as Isabelle's mother
 Memmo Carotenuto as policeman in Rome
 Giustino Durano as baker
 Geneviève Fontanel as Socratès's friend

Reception
According to Fox records, the film needed to earn $1,400,000 in rentals to break even and made $780,000, meaning it made a loss.

References

External links
 
 
 New York Times Review By Bosley Crowther Published: February 15, 1966

1964 films
1964 romantic comedy films
1960s French films
1960s French-language films
1960s Italian films
Films directed by Philippe de Broca
Films based on French novels
Films scored by Georges Delerue
Films shot in Paris
French romantic comedy films
French-language Italian films
Italian romantic comedy films